Vrbas Oblast was one of the oblasts of the Kingdom of Serbs, Croats and Slovenes from 1922 to 1929. Its capital was Banja Luka. It was named after the Vrbas River.

History 
The Kingdom of Serbs, Croats and Slovenes was formed in 1918 and was initially divided into counties and districts (this division was inherited from previous state administrations). In 1922, the country was divided into 33 new administrative units known as oblasts (Serbo-Croatian: oblasti / области).  Before 1922, the territory of the Vrbas Oblast was primarily part of the Banja Luka District.

In 1929, the 33 oblasts were administratively replaced with 9 banovinas and one district, and the territory of the Vrbas Oblast formed the core of the new Vrbas Banovina.

Geography 
The Vrbas Oblast included eastern Bosanska Krajina and western Semberija. It shared borders with the Tuzla Oblast in the east, the Travnik Oblast in the south, the Bihać Oblast in the west, the Osijek Oblast in the north, and the Primorje-Krajina Oblast in the north-west.

Demographics 
According to 1921 census, the Vrbas Oblast was linguistically dominated by speakers of Serbo-Croatian.

Cities and Towns 
The main cities and towns located within the oblast were:

 Banja Luka
 Novi Grad
 Kostajnica
 Laktaši
 Prijedor
 Gradiška
 Prnjavor
 Brod

All mentioned cities and towns are now part of Bosnia and Herzegovina

See also 

 Banja Luka
 Vrbas (river)
 Kingdom of Serbs, Croats and Slovenes

References

Further reading 

 Istorijski atlas, Geokarta, Beograd, 1999.
 Istorijski atlas, Intersistem kartografija, Beograd, 2010.

History of Bosanska Krajina
History of Banja Luka
Yugoslav Bosnia and Herzegovina
20th century in Bosnia and Herzegovina
Oblasts of the Kingdom of Serbs, Croats and Slovenes